The 1988 West Virginia gubernatorial election took place on November 8, 1988 to elect the governor of West Virginia. Incumbent Republican Governor Arch A. Moore Jr. ran for re-election to a fourth term in office, but was defeated by Democratic nominee Gaston Caperton.

Results

Democratic primary

Republican primary

General election

References

1988
gubernatorial
West Virginia